ISO 4157 is an ISO standard for construction drawings and designation systems.

It is composed of 3 parts:
ISO 4157-1:1998 "Construction drawings -- Designation systems -- Part 1: Buildings and parts of buildings"
ISO 4157-2:1998 "Construction drawings -- Designation systems -- Part 2: Room names and numbers"
ISO 4157-3:1998 "Construction drawings -- Designation systems -- Part 3: Room identifiers"

Main definitions:
Floor n: is the horizontal partition between storey n and storey (n+1). The floor in storey 5 is named as floor 4.
Room: identifiable physical space (area or volume, space or void) real or theoretical, although not necessary a traditional room (i.e., enclosed by walls, ceiling and floor).
Room identifiers: registration number of spaces:
Room numbers: numbers (code) of rooms

Standard samples:
 00 Ground floor
 05 5th floor
 -2 2nd basement floor
 #0215 2nd floor, room 15

See also
List of ISO standards

04157
Construction standards